is the ninth single by Japanese girl group Melon Kinenbi. It was released on May 8, 2003, and its highest position on the Oricon weekly chart was #10.

Track listing

External links
Chance of Love at the Up-Front Works release list (Japanese)

2003 singles
Zetima Records singles
Song recordings produced by Tsunku
2003 songs
Torch songs
Dance-pop songs